
Gmina Nozdrzec is a rural gmina (administrative district) in Brzozów County, Subcarpathian Voivodeship, in south-eastern Poland.

The gmina covers an area of 

As of 2006 its total population is 8,492.

Villages
Gmina Nozdrzec contains the villages and settlements of Hłudno, Huta Poręby, Izdebki, Nozdrzec, Rudawiec, Ryta Górka, Siedliska, Ujazdy, Wara, Wesoła, Wola Wołodzka and Wołodź.

Neighbouring gminas
Gmina Nozdrzec is bordered by the gminas of Bircza, Błażowa, Brzozów, Domaradz, Dydnia and Dynów.

References
 Polish official population figures, 2006

Nozdrzec
Brzozów County